Dameane Douglas  (born March 15, 1976) is a former American football wide receiver in the National Football League. Drafted by the Oakland Raiders in the 1999 NFL Draft, Douglas played 4 seasons with the Philadelphia Eagles (1999–2002). He was with the Kansas City Chiefs in the 2003 season but was placed on injured reserve on August 26 and subsequently released on October 13 after receiving an injury settlement.  He played college football at University of California, Berkeley.

References

1976 births
Living people
People from Hanford, California
American football wide receivers
California Golden Bears football players
Philadelphia Eagles players
Kansas City Chiefs players
Players of American football from California